The 63rd NHK Cup, or as it is officially known the  was a professional shogi tournament organized by the Japan Shogi Association and sponsored by Japan's public broadcaster NHK. Play began on April 7, 2013, and ended on March 23, 2014. The 50-player single elimination tournament was won by Masataka Gōda. All of the tournament games were shown on NHK-E. The  during the NHK-E broadcasts was female professional Rieko Yauchi.

Participants

Preliminary tournaments
A total of 130 professional shogi players competed in 18 preliminary tournaments to qualify for the main tournament. These tournaments were non-televised one-day tournaments held at the Tokyo Shogi Kaikan and the Kansai Shogi Kaikan. Each tournament consisted of seven or eight players. The initial time control for each player was 20 minutes followed by a 30-second byōyomi.

The female professional seed was Hatsumi Ueda. Brackets from two of the preliminary tournaments are shown below.

Main tournament
The first time control for main tournament games was ten minutes per player. Once this was used up, a second time control of 10 one-minute periods of  began. Each player was given 30 seconds to make their move. If they did so, then no thinking time periods were used. If, however, they did not, a thinking time period began and they then had up to one minute (more specifically 59 seconds) to make a move before entering the next thinking time period. This process was repeated until a player had used all ten thinking time periods when the final byōyomi time control of 30 seconds per move began. Sente was determined prior to each game by piece toss.

The 50 players listed below qualified for the main tournament.

Notes:
 "No." represents the bracket position of the player in their respective block and "Rank/Title" represents the rank or titles held by the player when the original bracket finalized. A  grading system is used for ranking players.
 Players whose names are in bold were seeded directly into the main tournament as follows:
 62nd NHK Cup (four players):  Watanabe (champion), Habu (runner-up), Suzuki (semifinalist) and Gōda (semifinalist).
 Seven major titleholders (two players): Moriuchi (Meijin) and Satō (ōshō)
 Class A (six players): Miura, Tanigawa, Yashiki, Takahashi, Hashimoto and Fukaura
 Class B1 (twelve players): Maruyama, Kubo, Akutsu, Kimura, Namekata, Yamasaki, Inoue, Matsuo, Nakata, Hatakeyama, Hirose and Iizuka
 Other tournament winners (one player): Nagase (Shinjin-Ō)
 Women's professional (one player): Ueda Women's 3 dan (Mynavi Women's Shogi Open Champion)
 Others with outstanding records (six players): Iijima (Class B2), Toyoshima (Class B2), Murayama (Class C1), Itodani (Class C1), Nakamura (Class C1), Ōishi (Class C2)
Among these 32 seeds, the following 14 were given byes in round 1 and began play in round 2: Watanabe, Habu, Suzuki, Gōda, Moriuchi, Satō, Miura, Tanigawa, Yashiki, Takahashi, Hashimoto, Fukaura, Maruyama, and Kubo.
 The remaining players qualified by winning preliminary tournaments.

The bracket at the start of the tournament is shown below.

Results
Winners are listed in bold. "Date" refers to the date the game was broadcast. Dan and titles are as of the date the game was broadcast. "Guest Analyst" refers to the kishi who provided expert commentary during the broadcast. "No. of moves" refers to the total number of moves played in the game.

Round 1
A total of 18 games were played in round 1. Play began on April 7, 2013, and ended on August 8, 2013. The 18 preliminary tournament winners were paired against 18 seeded players.

Round 2
A total of 16 games were played in round 2. Play began on August 11, 2013, and ended on November 24, 2013. The 18 winners from round 1 were joined by the 14 players who had received round 1 byes.

Round 3
Play began on December 1, 2013, and ended on January 26, 2014. Out of the 18 preliminary tournament winners, only the following four made it to round 3: Kanai 5d, Nishikawa 4d, Takazaki 6d and Funae 5d

Quarterfinals
The eight remaining players were paired off against each other with play beginning on February 2 and ending on February 23, 2014. Only one major titleholder, Moriuchi 2 crown, made it as far as the quarterfinals.

Semifinals
The two remaining players from each block with paired against each other to determine the respective block winners. The 1st semifinal game between Kazuhiro Nishikawa 4d (sente) and Masataka Gōda 9d (gote) was broadcast on March 2, 2014. Gōda won the game in 128 moves, thus stopping Nishikawa's NHK Cup winning streak at six. The guest analyst was Kunio Naitō 9d. The 2nd semifinal game was between Tadashi Ōishi 6d (sente) and Tadahisa Maruyama 9d (gote). The game was broadcast on March 9, 2014, and won by Maruyama in 104 moves. The guest analyst was Daisuke Katagami 6d.

Finals
After 112 preliminary tournament games and 48 main tournament games involving 162 players, Tadashisa Maruyama 9d and Masataka Gōda 9d met in the final broadcast on March 23, 2014. This was the second NHK Cup final appearance for both players: Maruyama defeated Akira Watanabe to win the 55th NHK Cup (2005) and Gōda was runner-up to Daisuke Suzuki in the 49th NHK Cup (1999). The piece toss before the game resulted in Maruyama being sente. Gōda won the game in 82 moves, thus winning the tournament for the first time and becoming the 63rd NHK Cup Champion. The guest analysts for the final match were Toshiyuki Moriuchi 2-crown and Keita Inoue 9d and the hosts of the final were NHK announcer  and women's professional Rieko Yauchi.

The game score and a diagram showing the final position is given below.
Sente: Tadahisa Maruyama 9d
Gote: Masataka Gōda 9d
Opening: Yokufudori
1. P-2f, 2. P-3d, 3. P-7f, 4. P-8d, 5. P-2e, 6. P-8e, 7. G-7h, 8. G-3b, 9. P-2d, 10. Px2d, 11. Rx2d, 12. P-8f, 13. Px8f, 14. Rx8f, 15. Rx3d, 16. B-3c, 17. K-5h, 18. K-4a, 19. P-3f, 20. G-5a, 21. N-3g, 22. S-6b, 23. S-3h, 24. S-2b, 25. P-9f, 26. P-9d, 27. N-4e, 28. P*3g, 29. Sx3g, 30. Bx8h+, 31. Sx8h, 32. B*5e, 33. B*7g, 34. Rx7f, 35. R-8d, 36. Bx3g+, 37. Rx8a+, 38. R-7e, 39. G-4h, 40. +Bx4h, 41. Kx4h, 42. Rx4e, 43. B*3d, 44. R-7e, 45. K-5h, 46. S-3c, 47. B-1f, 48. N*6e, 49. P*2d, 50. P*2b, 51. +Rx9a, 52. Nx7g+, 53. Sx7g, 54. B*3g, 55. N*3e, 56. P*3d, 57. L*4f, 58. S*4b, 59. P*7b, 60. Px3e, 61. P-6f, 62. N*8e, 63. P-7a+, 64. Nx7g+, 65. Nx7g, 66. S*7f, 67. N*8i, 68. G*5i, 69. K-6h, 70. B-4h+, 71. +P-7b, 72. +B-5h, 73. K-7i, 74. +B-6i, 75. K-8h, 76. +Bx7h, 77. Kx7h, 78. G*6g, 79. K-8h, 80. Gx7g, 81. Nx7g, 82. Sx7g+,  sente resigns (diagram)

The final tournament bracket is shown below.

Other
 Sente won 27 (a little more than 55%) of the 49 games.
 The average number of moves for the main tournament games was 122. The most moves played in a single game was 212 (Rd. 2, Suzuki 8d vs. Takazaki 6d) while the fewest moves played was 77 (Rd. 2, Ōishi 6d vs. Namekata 8d).
The age breakdown (age at start of the tournament) for the players who qualified was as follows: 10–19 years old, 3 players; 20–29 years old, 14 players; 30–39 years old, 15 players; 40–49 years old, 15 players; 50–59 years old, 2 players; 60+ years old, 1 player. The oldest player was Keiji Mori 9d (67 years old) and the youngest player was Kōru Abe 4d (18 years old).

See also
61st NHK Cup (shogi)
62nd NHK Cup (shogi)
64th NHK Cup (shogi)

Notes

References

External links
Official 63rd NHK Cup Shogi TV tournament website  

NHK Cup (shogi)
Japanese television series
NHK original programming